English is a 2004 Chinese coming-of-age novel by Wang Gang, about a boy growing up during the Cultural Revolution in remote Ürümqi, home to many political exiles including the boy's intellectual parents. English has been translated into English and many other languages.

Wang Gang wrote a sequel in 2012, titled Kashgar, which follows the protagonist in his late teens.

Characters
Love Liu (刘爱, Liu Ai), the protagonist
Sunrise Huang (黄旭升, Huang Xusheng), Liu's classmate
Garbage Li, real name Li Jianming, Liu's classmate
Second Prize Wang (王亚军, Wang Yajun), Liu's English teacher from Shanghai
Ahjitai, Liu's Uyghur teacher
Love Liu's father
Love Liu's mother
Sunrise Huang's father
Sunrise Huang's mother
Principal
Commander Shen
Director Fan

Adaptation
A film adaptation directed by Joan Chen is currently in post-production.

References

2004 Chinese novels
Bildungsromans
Novels about the Cultural Revolution
Chinese novels adapted into films
Novels set in Xinjiang